Monique Mathys (born 24 October 1945) is a Swiss figure skater. She competed in the pairs event at the 1964 Winter Olympics.

References

1945 births
Living people
Swiss female pair skaters
Olympic figure skaters of Switzerland
Figure skaters at the 1964 Winter Olympics
Place of birth missing (living people)